Guynes is a surname. Notable people with the surname include:

Demi Moore, née Demi Guynes (born 1962), American actress and film producer
Jasper Felix Guynes (1875-1961), American politician and judge
Thomas Guynes (born 1974), American football player

See also
Guines (disambiguation)